Buszkowice  is a village in the administrative district of Gmina Żurawica, within Przemyśl County, Subcarpathian Voivodeship, in south-eastern Poland.

The village has a population of 830.

References

Buszkowice